Aghbalou may refer to: 
Aghbalou, Algeria
Aghbalou, Morocco